Al-Baleed Archaeological Park is an archaeological park located in Al Balīd of Salalah, Dhofar, Oman. It is a part of the Land of Frankincense in the UNESCO World Heritage Site since 2000.

The ruins in the park belong to the ancient city of Z̧afār which also covers the adjacent area in Ar Rubāţ. Z̧afār, from which the Dhofar Governorate got its name, acted as an important port for frankincense trade during the medieval times, after the decline of the nearby port in Khor Rori.  The Roman name for the city was Saffara Metropolis and it is known primarily from its placement, together with Ubar, on maps drawn by Ptolemy, the Alexandrian astronomer and geographer. 

It was visited by many famous travellers, such as Marco Polo, Ibn Battuta, Ibn al-Mujawir and Zheng He. The city declined in the 16th–17th centuries due to various reasons such as closures of the lagoon (Khawr al Balīd) and Portuguese/Turkish/Mamluk invasion.

The site was rediscovered in 1992 by a team led by Nicholas Clapp and archaeologist Juris Zarins of Southwest Missouri State University. 

The park also contains the Museum of the Land of Frankincense.

References

External links 

 

Land of Frankincense
Archaeological sites in Oman
Salalah